Alexander Novikov (1900–1976) was a Soviet Air Force marshal.

Alexander or Aleksandr Novikov may also refer to:

 Alexander Novikov (mathematician), professor of mathematics
 Aleksandr Novikov (footballer, born 1955), Soviet and Russian football player and coach
 Aleksandr Novikov (footballer, born 1958) (1958–1991), Soviet football player, 1977 FIFA World Youth Championship winner
 Aleksandr Novikov (footballer, born 2002), Russian football player
 Aleksandr Aleksandrovich Novikov (born 1984), Russian footballer
 Aleksandr Novikov (rower) (born 1985), Belarusian Olympic rower
 Aleksandr Novikov (singer) (born 1953), Soviet and Russian author and performer of songs